Doubek (Czech: little oak) may refer to:
 Doubek (Prague-East District), village in the Central Bohemian Region of the Czech Republic
 Doubek (nature reserve), nature reserve in the Přerov District of the Czech Republic

Doubek is also a surname and may refer to:
 Jaroslav Doubek (born 1931), Czech speed skater, participant of the 1956 Winter Olympics